John McKinley (May 1, 1780 – July 19, 1852) was a United States Senator from the state of Alabama and an associate justice of the Supreme Court of the United States.

Early life
McKinley was born in Culpeper County, Virginia, on May 1, 1780, to Andrew McKinley and Mary (Logan) McKinley (sister of Benjamin Logan). His family moved to Kentucky in 1783. There, he read law and was admitted to the bar in 1800, practicing in Frankfort and in Louisville. In 1818, he moved to Alabama. He established legal practice in Huntsville, and also actively engaged in land speculation.

Political career
McKinley was elected to the Alabama House of Representatives in August 1820. the next year he moved his family from Huntsville to Florence, and so was ineligible for re-election.

When failing health forced John Williams Walker to resign from the United States Senate in 1822, Mckinley was the favored candidate in the special election to fill the vacancy, but lost to William Kelly by a one-vote margin.

November 27, 1826, he was elected as a Jacksonian to finish the unexpired term of Senator Henry H. Chambers, who died in office. When he sought re-election in 1830, he lost to Gabriel Moore.
 
During the 1830s, McKinley was twice elected to the Alabama House, in 1831 and 1836. In between he served one term in the United States House of Representatives, during the 1833–35 23rd Congress. There he was a champion of President Andrew Jackson's political agenda. He also was a Presidential Elector in the 1836 presidential election, casting his vote for Martin Van Buren. McKinley was again elected to the U.S. Senate in 1836, this time easily defeating Gabriel Moore. He did not remain in office long however, as he resigned in April 1837, to take a seat on the United States Supreme Court.

Supreme Court service
The number of seats on the Supreme Court was expanded from seven to nine in March 1837, as a result of the Eighth and Ninth Circuits Act. This allowed President Jackson the opportunity to appoint two new associate justices, which he did on March 3, 1837, his last full day in office. The newly seated Senate of the 25th Congress confirmed both nominees; but one, William Smith, subsequently declined to serve.

President Martin Van Buren offered McKinley a recess appointment to the vacant seat on April 22, 1837, and later formally nominated him to for it on September 18, 1837. McKinley was confirmed by the United States Senate on September 25, 1837, by a voice vote.

McKinley was assigned to the ninth circuit, which encompassed the states of: Alabama, Mississippi, Louisiana, and Arkansas.

During his 14 years on the Court, McKinley wrote 22 opinions, several of which were dissenting opinions in the interest of preserving States' rights.

Noteworthy opinions include: Bank of Augusta v. Earle (1839); Groves v. Slaughter (1841); Pollard v. Hagan (1845) and Passenger Cases (1849).

Personal life
McKinley was married twice. In 1814, he married Juliana Bryan (d. 1822). They had three children: Elizabeth, Andrew and Mary. In 1824, he married Elizabeth Armistead (d. 1891). They had no children.

In 1821, McKinley was appointed to serve on the original board of trustees for the University of Alabama and helped plan the campus design and curriculum. He was also a founding member of the First Presbyterian Church of Florence, Alabama, where he was elected as an elder in 1826.

McKinley owned twelve slaves at the time of the 1850 census.

McKinley moved his family to Louisville, Kentucky soon after his appointment to the Supreme Court. He later died there on July 19, 1852, at the age of 72, and is buried at Cave Hill Cemetery.

Legacy and honors
The community of McKinley, Alabama is named in his honor.

The World War II Liberty ship  was named in his honor.

See also
List of justices of the Supreme Court of the United States

References

External links
 
 
 
 John McKinley, Washburn University School of Law, Topeka, Kansas.

|-

|-

|-

1780 births
1852 deaths
People from Culpeper County, Virginia
American Protestants
Alabama Democratic-Republicans
Jacksonian United States senators from Alabama
Jacksonian members of the United States House of Representatives from Alabama
Democratic Party United States senators from Alabama
Justices of the Supreme Court of the United States
United States federal judges appointed by Martin Van Buren
United States federal judges admitted to the practice of law by reading law
19th-century American judges
19th-century American politicians
Republican Party members of the Alabama House of Representatives
Burials at Cave Hill Cemetery
American slave owners
United States senators who owned slaves